Barbâtre is a commune in the Vendée department in the Pays de la Loire region in western France.

Geography 

The altitude of the commune of Barbâtre lies between 0 and 19 meters. The area of the commune is 12.47 km2.

Arms 

The arms of the commune feature a counterchanged sun without face on a blue and gold field divided horizontally ("per fess") in waves; the French blazon is coupé ondé d'azur et d'or, au soleil non figuré de l'un en l'autre.

See also 

 Communes of the Vendée department

References 

Communes of Vendée
Populated coastal places in France